The 1924 Green Bay Packers season was their sixth season overall and their fourth season in the National Football League. The team finished with a 7–4 league record under player/coach Curly Lambeau earning them a sixth-place finish in the standings.

Schedule

 Games in italics are exhibition games.

Standings

References
 Sportsencyclopedia.com
 1924 Green Bay Packers season

Green Bay Packers seasons
Green Bay Packers
Green Bay Packers